Gary F. McAdam (born December 31, 1955) is a Canadian former professional ice hockey player.

Career
Selected by the Buffalo Sabres in the 1975 NHL Entry Draft, McAdam also played for the Pittsburgh Penguins, Detroit Red Wings, Calgary Flames, Washington Capitals, New Jersey Devils, and Toronto Maple Leafs before retiring following the 1985–86 NHL season.

His finest pro season came in 1982-83 when he scored 40 goals and 29 assists in helping the Rochester Americans of the American Hockey League win the Calder Cup. He netted 11 shorthanded goals that season, an AHL record that still stands.

Personal
He is a resident of Portland, Maine and took over as head coach of the Deering High School hockey team in 1997.

Career statistics

Regular season and playoffs

Transactions
 February 6, 1979 – Traded to the Pittsburgh Penguins by the Buffalo Sabres for Dave Schultz.
 January 8, 1981 – Traded to the Detroit Red Wings by the Pittsburgh Penguins for Errol Thompson.
 November 10, 1981 – Traded to the Calgary Flames by the Detroit Red Wings with the Detroit Red Wings' 4th round choice (John Bekkers) in 1983 NHL Entry Draft for Eric Vail.
 September 17, 1982 – Signed as a free agent by the Buffalo Sabres.
 August 4, 1983 – Signed as a free agent by the New Jersey Devils.
 November 17, 1983 – Claimed on waivers by the Washington Capitals from the New Jersey Devils.
 January 18, 1984 – Rights traded to the New Jersey Devils by the Washington Capitals for cash.
 July 31, 1985 – Signed as a free agent by the Toronto Maple Leafs.

References

External links
 

1955 births
Living people
Buffalo Sabres draft picks
Buffalo Sabres players
Calgary Flames players
Canadian ice hockey forwards
Detroit Red Wings players
Ice hockey people from Ontario
New Jersey Devils players
Ottawa 67's players
People from Smiths Falls
Pittsburgh Penguins players
Rochester Americans players
St. Catharines Black Hawks players
Toronto Maple Leafs players
Washington Capitals players